Nikkal (logographically dNIN.GAL, alphabetically 𐎐𐎋𐎍 nkl) or Nikkal-wa-Ib (nkl wib) was a goddess worshiped in various areas of the ancient Near East west of Mesopotamia. She was derived from the Sumerian Ningal, and like her forerunner was regarded as the spouse of a moon god, whose precise identity varied between locations.

While well attested in Ugarit and in Hurrian and Hittite sources, she is otherwise virtually absent from documents from the western part of ancient Syria.

Name
Nikkal was derived from the Sumerian goddess Ningal (Sumerian: "great lady"), wife of the moon god Nanna, whose worship, similar to other eastern deities such as Ea, Damkina, Aya and Pinikir, was introduced from Mesopotamia to Hurrian areas possibly as early as in the third millennium BCE. Alfonso Archi assumes that the presence of Ningal in the pantheon of the kingdom of Mari was in part responsible for her adoption by the Hurrians and her later prominence in their religion. 

In Hittite sources the name was usually spelled logographically as dNIN.GAL though syllabic spellings such as dNi-ik-kal are also known.

An additional form of the name, Nikkal-wa-Ib ("Nikkal and Ib"), is known from Ugarit. It is commonly accepted that the second element means "fruit" in Ugaritic and that it is analogous to a similar epithet of the Mesopotamian moon god Nanna-Suen, dIn-bi, "the fruit." However, restorations of Ugaritic texts including the phrase ilat inbi, "goddess of fruit," are now regarded as erroneous and there is no evidence that such an epithet was ever applied to Nikkal independently from the name Nikkal-wa-Ib. An alternate interpretation associates Ib with Umbu, a name of the moon god in Hurrian sources which possibly originated in Upper Mesopotamia.

Association with other deities
The notion of Ningal being the wife of the moon god was retained by cultures who adopted her into their pantheons as Nikkal. Hurrian texts feature Nikkal paired with the moon god under both of his names, Kušuḫ and Umbu, while in Ugarit she was also regarded as married to the local moon god Yarikh. 

The Hittite text known as "prayer of Kantuzzili" refers to Ištanu (Sun god of Heaven) as Nikkal’s son.

Worship
Areas in which the worship of Nikkal is attested include Kizzuwatna, Ugarit and the Hittite Empire. It is assumed that she was received from Mesopotamia through Hurrian intermediaries. 

In Ugarit, according to Gernot Wilhelm and Piotr Taracha a major center of her cult, Nikkal is attested in both Ugaritic and Hurrian texts. Some researchers, for example Aicha Rahmouni, refer to her as a Hurrian deity even while discussing Ugaritic sources. Multiple theophoric names invoking her are known from the city, including attestations of a princess bearing the name Eḫli-Nikkal.

One document pertaining to the cult of Nikkal in Ugarit is a tablet inscribed with a Hurrian hymn dedicated to her, accompanied by notation.  Its contents were originally published by Emmanuel Laroche alongside other Hurrian texts from Ugarit in 1968, while the first author to propose that the text might represent musical notation was Hans Gustav Güterbock in 1970.

In Hurro-Hittite sources Nikkal appears in the offering lists (kaluti) of the circle of the goddess Hebat. She could function as an oath deity alongside her husband and Ishara, though such attestations are not common. She was also among the deities depicted in the Yazılıkaya sanctuary, where she appears as the figure designated as number 54 by modern authors, between Damkina and Aya.

A number of Hittite theophoric names invoking her are known, with a notable example being queen Nikkal-mati and her daughter Ashmu-Nikkal. It is possible that Nikkal-mati was the queen who according to a Middle Hittite document presided over a private ritual to Nikkal, in which her two sons, a priest (possibly named Kantuzzili) and a certain Tulpi-Teshub also took part. Most Hittite ritual texts mentioning the goddess are assumed to be influenced by the culture of Kizzuwatna. 

Nikkal is not attested in non-Hurrian non-Ugaritic sources from bronze age western Syria. For instance, she is not among the deities present from the documents from Emar, despite the presence of a presently unidentified moon god whose name was written logographically as dXXX. 

In Egypt Nikkal is only attested in Leiden Magical Papyrus I (dated to the reign of the Twentieth Dynasty of Egypt), in which she appears as a foreign deity implored to heal a specific affliction.

Mythology
Due to Nikkal’s infrequent appearances in mythical texts discussion of her character is regarded as largely speculative.

She appears in an Ugaritic text (CAT 1.24) describing the circumstances of her marriage to the moon god, Yarikh.  It is assumed that the myth is either a translation of a Hurrian text, or at least an adaptation of motifs pertaining to Nikkal and Kušuḫ in Hurrian mythology. A possible indication that the text's forerunners originated outside Ugarit is also the presence of a reference to Dagan of Tuttul in it. 

Through the text, Nikkal is referred to as glmt, "young woman." Based on the use of the term in other Ugaritic texts, especially the Epic of king Kirta, it is assumed that it can designate a bride.

Another god mentioned in this narrative, though absent from any other surviving texts, Ḫrḫb, might be Nikkal's father. However, modern restorations of the text indicate explicit references to such a relation are lacking. He is referred to with two epithets, with the first being agreed to mean "king of summer" or "king of the summer fruit," while the meaning of the second is regarded as connected to the institution of marriage (proposals include "king of weddings," "king of the wedding season" and "king of marriage"). In the past interpretations such as "king of the raiding season" were also proposed. He is assumed to be a deity of Hurrian origin, and it is possible that his name might mean "he of the mountain Ḫiriḫ(i)," and end with the suffix -bi (Ḫiriḫ(i)bi). This type of divine name would be similar to these of Hurrian deities Kumarbi and Nabarbi, meaning respectively "he of Kumme" and "she of Nawar."

Ḫrḫb initially proposes other prospective brides to Yarikh in place of Nikkal, Baal's daughter Pidray and Attar's daughter ybrdmy, leading some researchers to propose he is simply the matchmaker, rather than Nikkal's father. Yarikh shows no interest in either of these goddesses. After showing he is willing to offer a large amount of silver, gold and lapis lazuli and promising that he is capable of siring a child he secures a permission to marry Nikkal. He states that he will "make her fields vineyards, fields of her love orchards," which is both a figurative and metaphorical reference to the marriage being fruitful according to Steve A. Wiggins.

It has been proposed that a poorly preserved section of the text describes a sexual encounter between Nikkal and Yarikh, but this remains uncertain.

References

Bibliography

 

Ugaritic deities
Hurrian deities